Spanish omelette or Spanish tortilla is a traditional dish from Spain. Celebrated as a national dish by Spaniards, it is an essential part of the Spanish cuisine. It is an omelette made with eggs and potatoes, optionally including onion. It is often served at room temperature as a tapa.

History 

The first reference to the tortilla in Spanish is found in a Navarrese document, as an anonymous "mousehole memorial" addressed to the court of Navarre in 1817. It explains the sparse conditions of Navarre's farmers in contrast with those in Pamplona (the capital) and la Ribera (in southern Navarre). After listing the sparse food eaten by highlanders, the next quote follows: "…two to three eggs in tortilla for 5 or 6 [people] as our women know how to make it big and thick with fewer eggs, mixing potatoes, breadcrumbs or whatever."

According to legend, during the siege of Bilbao, Carlist general Tomás de Zumalacárregui invented the "tortilla de patatas" as an easy, fast and nutritious dish to satisfy the scarcities of the Carlist army. Although it remains unknown whether this is true, it appears the tortilla started to spread during the early Carlist Wars.

Another tale is that the recipe was learnt by Spanish prisoners captured after the Battle of Montes Claros during the Portuguese Restoration War in 1665. After the Portuguese victory, more than 6,000 Spanish soldiers were kept in captivity for 3 years until the 1668 Treaty of Lisbon was signed. Upon their release, these prisoners brought part of the culture of Alentejo to Spain, including many recipes, which featured a potato egg pie that evolved into the modern version of "tortilla".

Nomenclature
The word tortilla, in European Spanish as well as in some variants of Latin American Spanish, means omelette. As such, a potato omelette is a tortilla de patatas or papas.

As the dish has gained international popularity, and perhaps to avoid being confused with the thin flatbread made out of wheat or maize popular in Mexico and Central America, the española or Spanish naming gained traction. As such, 'Spanish omelette' or 'Spanish tortilla' are its common names in English, while tortilla española is the formally accepted name even within the peninsula. In Spain, an omelette (made of beaten eggs fried with olive oil) is conversely known as tortilla francesa.

Tortilla is the diminutive form of torta, meaning 'small pancake'.

Consumption and traditional recipe
The Spanish omelette is one of the most widely available dishes in Spain, also prepared in some Spanish-speaking countries.

The two main options are either with or without onion in it, with consumers almost always having a preference. The addition of onion is the cause of an unresolved dispute, pitting concebollistas (those advocating for the tortilla with onion) against sincebollistas (those considering the onion an attack against the dish's authenticity). It may be related to the tenderness of the local varieties of potato. The indication of whether a tortilla includes onion or not is expected from restaurateurs, and industrial producers market both options.

The most common procedure to cook a Spanish omelette is as follows:

 The potatoes, ideally a starchy variety, are cut into thin slices or small dice.
 They are then seasoned and sautéed in vegetable oil, traditionally olive oil, with sliced onions being added at this stage if used. These ingredients are stirred at a moderate temperature until they are soft but not brown.
 The potatoes (and onions, if included) are then removed, drained, and mixed with whisked eggs.
 This mixture is then returned to the pan and slowly cooked, turning the omelette to cook both sides.
 Once the eggs are cooked on one side, a plate is placed over the mixture so the pan can be inverted.
 The mixture is then slipped back into the pan to cook the other side.

The omelette may be eaten hot, at room temperature, or cold; it is commonly served as a tapa. As a tapa, it may be cut into bite-size pieces and served on cocktail sticks; a large tortilla can be cut into triangular portions (pincho de tortilla) to be eaten as a finger food.

Tortilla Day 
Día de la Tortilla ("Tortilla Day") is a popular festivity celebrated in many towns in southern and western Spain. Its date varies depending on the town; however, it normally coincides with the Thursday before Lent, the first day of Carnival, also known as "Jueves Lardero" (Fat Thursday). Many towns in eastern Spain have a similar celebration on that day. Traditionally, the inhabitants of each town go to a nearby rural area where they spend the day among family members and friends, eating Spanish tortillas and other foods, and playing games.

See also

References
Bibliography

Bibliography

External links

Spanish cuisine
Egg dishes
Omelettes
Potato dishes
National dishes
Tapas
Food combinations